This is a list of medalists at the FIG World Cup Final.

Acrobatic gymnastics

IFSA era 

1975

1977

1981

1983

1985

1987

1989

1991

1993

FIG era 

2003

2007

Aerobic gymnastics 

2001

2003

2007

Artistic gymnastics 

1975

1977

1978

1979

1980

1982

1986

1990

1998

2000

2002

2004

2006

2008

Rhythmic gymnastics 

1983

1986

1990

2000

2002

2004

2006

2008

Trampoline and tumbling

FIT era 

1993

1995

1997

FIG era 

1999

2000

2002

2004

2006

2008

References 

Gymnastics competitions
Lists of medalists in gymnastics
Medalists